The 23rd Street station is a station on the PATH system. Located at the intersection of 23rd Street and Sixth Avenue (Avenue of the Americas) in the Chelsea neighborhood of Manhattan, New York City, it is served by the Hoboken–33rd Street and Journal Square–33rd Street lines on weekdays, and by the Journal Square–33rd Street (via Hoboken) line on weekends.

History
The station opened on June 15, 1908. Before the line was extended to 23rd Street, the northern terminus of the Hudson and Manhattan Railroad was a  station located at 19th Street (now closed).

Station layout
This PATH station has side platforms, but passengers must descend one level, walk through an underpass, and go up another stairwell, leading to the New York City Subway mezzanine. The PATH fare control is located in the underpass, which is underneath the tracks of the IND Sixth Avenue Line.

The express tracks were constructed in the mid-1960s using the "deep-bore" tunneling method and both are not visible from the station. On the express tracks on the lower level, the deep-bore tunnel's round shape becomes square below this station and at 14th Street stations, where provisions for lower level platforms were built.

Exits
The northbound platform can be accessed from the exits on the east side of 23rd Street and Sixth Avenue, while the southbound platform can be accessed from the exits on the west side. There are two exits to each corner of that intersection, which serve both the subway and PATH platforms in each direction. The PATH station has direct entrances only from the IND station on either side, which are accessed only by going below the subway platform in the respective direction and then ascending onto the PATH platform. The 33rd Street-bound PATH is accessed from the northbound subway platform, while the New Jersey-bound PATH is accessed from the southbound subway platform. The southern entrances on each side appear to be part of the original 1911 PATH entrances.

The station is near the Flatiron Building, Madison Square Park, Metropolitan Life Insurance Company Tower, and New York Life Insurance Building.

References

External links

PATH - 23rd Street Station 
 23rd Street entrance from Google Maps Street View
 Platform from Google Maps Street View

PATH stations in Manhattan
Sixth Avenue
Railway stations in the United States opened in 1908
Chelsea, Manhattan
1908 establishments in New York City
23rd Street (Manhattan)
Railway stations located underground in New York (state)